Atlantes was a powerful sorcerer featured in chansons de geste.  In Boiardo's Orlando Innamorato (1482), where he is known as Atalante, the magician fears that Rugiero (Boiardo's spelling) will convert to Christianity and aid Charlemagne against the Saracens. To prevent this and forestall Rugiero's death, he constructs a magic garden ringed by glass on Mt. Carena in the Atlas Mountains, after which he is named. In Orlando Furioso, Atlantes' magical castle is filled with illusions, in order to divert Ruggiero (Ariosto's spelling) from what he has foretold as certain doom. Ruggiero is later set free by Bradamante and after numerous trials and quests sires a great line of heroes. He later dies betrayed fulfilling the destiny foretold by Atlantes.

See also
Cantar de gesta
Anglo-Norman literature
Romance (heroic literature)

References

Sources
Boiardo: Orlando innamorato ed. Giuseppe Anceschi  (Garzanti,1978)
Boiardo: Orlando innamorato translated by Charles Stanley Ross, (Parlor Press, 2004).
Ariosto:Orlando Furioso, verse translation by Barbara Reynolds in two volumes (Penguin Classics, 1975). Part one (cantos 1–23) ; part two (cantos 24–46) 
Ariosto: Orlando Furioso ed. Marcello Turchi (Garzanti, 1974)
Ariosto: Orlando Furioso: A Selection ed. Pamela Waley (Manchester University Press, 1975)

Fictional characters introduced in the 15th century
Matter of France
Characters in Orlando Innamorato and Orlando Furioso
Fictional characters who use magic
French folklore